Fjell is a village in Øygarden municipality in Vestland county, Norway. The village is the site of Fjell Church.

References

Villages in Vestland
Øygarden